Pristimantis leoni is an endangered species of frog in the family Strabomantidae.
It is found in Colombia and Ecuador.
Its natural habitats are tropical moist montane forests, high-altitude shrubland, high-altitude grassland, rural gardens, and heavily degraded former forest.

References

 Castro, F., Herrera, M., Coloma, L.A., Ron, S.R., Lynch, J., Almeida, D., Nogales, F. & Yánez-Muñoz, M. 2010.  Eleutherodactylus leoni.   2006 IUCN Red List of Threatened Species. 

leoni
Amphibians of the Andes
Amphibians of Colombia
Amphibians of Ecuador
Amphibians described in 1976
Taxonomy articles created by Polbot